Ubiquitin-associated protein 1 is a protein that in humans is encoded by the UBAP1 gene.

This gene is a member of the ubiquitin-associated domain (UBA) family, whose members include proteins having connections to ubiquitin and the ubiquitination pathway. The ubiquitin associated domain is thought to be a non-covalent ubiquitin-binding domain consisting of a compact three-helix bundle. This particular protein originates from a gene locus in a refined region on chromosome 9 undergoing loss of heterozygosity in nasopharyngeal carcinoma (NPC). Taking into account its cytogenetic location, this UBA domain family member is being studies as a putative target for mutation in nasopharyngeal carcinomas. Truncating Mutations in UBAP1 Cause Hereditary Spastic Paraplegia.

Model organisms 

Model organisms have been used in the study of UBAP1 function. A conditional knockout mouse line, called Ubap1tm1a(EUCOMM)Wtsi was generated as part of the International Knockout Mouse Consortium program — a high-throughput mutagenesis project to generate and distribute animal models of disease to interested scientists — at the Wellcome Trust Sanger Institute.

Male and female animals underwent a standardized phenotypic screen to determine the effects of deletion. Twenty five tests were carried out and two phenotypes were reported. Fewer homozygous mutant embryos were identified during gestation than predicted, and none survived until weaning. The remaining tests were carried out on heterozygous mutant adult mice; no significant abnormalities were observed in these animals.

References

Further reading 

 
 
 
 
 
 
 
 
 
 
 

Genes mutated in mice